A lantern man is an atmospheric ghost light, in the folklore of The Fens of East Anglia, seen around Wicken Fen and other areas. According to the stories, first collected by folklorist L.F. Newman, the lights, believed to be evil spirits trying to draw victims to their death in the reed beds, were drawn to the sound of whistling and could be evaded by lying face down on the ground with your mouth in the mud. The phenomenon, which seems to be a variation of will-o'-the-wisp folklore, is now dismissed as the result of combustible marsh gas.

Encounters
A local fisherman recounted to parapsychologist Peter Underwood how he had once thrown himself to the floor to escape the attention of a lantern man which had been drawn to his whistling.

Another local man recounted to folklorist L.F. Newman how he had attracted the attention of a lantern man while whistling to his dog while walking on the fen. The man had taken shelter at the home of a friend, who hung out a horn on a long pole to distract the spirit. The following morning the horn was found to have been burnt up.

References 

Atmospheric ghost lights
Supernatural legends
English legendary creatures
Cambridgeshire folklore